Trichomecyna fuscovittata is a species of beetle in the family Cerambycidae, and the only species in the genus Trichomecyna. It was described by Breuning in 1939.

It's 13 mm long and 3.5 mm wide, and its type locality is the Thua River, Kenya.

References

Apomecynini
Beetles described in 1939
Taxa named by Stephan von Breuning (entomologist)
Monotypic beetle genera